John Healy may refer to:

John Healy (author) (born 1943), British author of The Grass Arena
John Healy (bishop) (1841–1918), Irish Roman Catholic archbishop of Tuam, 1896–1918
John Healy (cricketer) (1851–1916), Australian cricketer
John Healy (entrepreneur) (1840–1908), 19th-century American entrepreneur
John Healy (hurler), Irish hurler
John Healy (Irish journalist) (1930–1991), Irish journalist for Western People and The Irish Times
John Healy (Irish politician) (died 1995), Irish Fianna Fáil politician from Kerry
 John Healy (priest) (1850–1942), Irish Anglican priest, sometime Archdeacon of Meath
John Edward Healy (1872–1934), Irish Journalist and Barrister
John Farmer Healy (1900–1973), Jamaican-born Roman Catholic Bishop
John F. Healy (c.1924–2012), British scholar, classicist and writer
Egyptian Healy (John J. Healy, 1866–1899), American baseball player
Jack Healy (died 1972), American actor and manager
John Healy (Australian politician) (1894–1970)

See also
John Healey (disambiguation)
Jackie Healy-Rae (1931–2014), Irish politician
Jack Healey (born 1938), human rights activist